Lao Army Football Club is a football club based in Vientiane, Laos. They play in the Lao League 1, the top national football league in Laos.

Sponsors

Honours
Lao League:
Champions 1990, 1991, 1992, 1993, 1994, 1996, 1997, 2008
Lao Division 1 League:
Champions 2017,
Prime Minister's Cup
Winners (1): 2013

Players

Club Officials

References

External links
 Weltfussballarchiv

Football clubs in Laos
Military association football clubs